Pedro's Treachery is a 1913 silent film drama short directed by and starring Romaine Fielding and produced by the Lubin Manufacturing Company.

Cast
Romaine Fielding - Ned Fields
Mary Ryan - Helen Andrew
Robyn Adair - Bob Murray
Reina Salder - Juanita
Henry Aldrich - Pedro

References

External links
 Pedro's Treachery at IMDb.com

1913 films
American silent short films
1913 short films
American black-and-white films
Silent American drama films
1913 drama films
Films directed by Romaine Fielding
1910s American films